Fishing Lake 89 is an Indian reserve of the Fishing Lake First Nation in Saskatchewan. It is 119 kilometres north of Fort Qu'Appelle. In the 2016 Canadian Census, it recorded a population of 406 living in 128 of its 161 total private dwellings. In the same year, its Community Well-Being index was calculated at 54 of 100, compared to 58.4 for the average First Nations community and 77.5 for the average non-Indigenous community.

References

Indian reserves in Saskatchewan
Division No. 10, Saskatchewan
Fishing Lake First Nation